Potamocypris arcuata is a species of ostracod crustacean in the family Cyprididae, subfamily Cypridopsinae. It is mainly known from the southern areas of the Palaearctic.

Description
The carapace of P. arcuata is laterally compressed and approximately kidney-shaped in lateral view. The valve surface is covered with tiny pits and dense setae. Colour: pale green with a dark green dorsal blob. The length of carapace ranges from 0.50 to 0.81 mm. The second antennae carry swimming setae that extend beyond the tips of the terminal claws.

Reproduction
Bisexual populations (with males and females) are reported from North Africa only. All other known populations consist of females only and are therefore inferred to reproduce by parthenogenesis.

References

Literature
 Martens, K. & S. Savatenalinton, 2011. A Subjective Checklist of the Recent, Free-Living, Non-Marine Ostracoda (Crustacea). Zootaxa 2855: 1-79.
 Meisch, C. 1985. Revision of the Recent West European Species of the Genus Potamocypris. Part II. Species with long swimming setae on the second antennae. Travaux scientifiques du Musée d'histoire naturelle de Luxembourg 6: 67-72.
 Meisch, C., 2000. Freshwater Ostracoda of Western and Central Europe. Spektrum Akademischer Verlag, Heidelberg, Berlin. 522 p.

External links

Cyprididae
Freshwater crustaceans of Africa
Crustaceans described in 1903